The Bobos River is a river in Guatemala. It rises in the Sierra de Caral, a small mountain range in the eastern department of Izabal and runs in a north-westerly direction to join the Motagua River. 

References

Sierra Caral. 2007. FUNDAECO.

Rivers of Guatemala